The Yellow Cake Revue is a musical composition for piano and voice. Peter Maxwell Davies composed the piece in 1980. He first performed it at the Stromness Hotel, in Stromness, Orkney, as part of the 1980 St Magnus Festival—a summer arts festival that he co-founded in 1977. English actress Eleanor Bron recited the spoken word portions for the debut performance.

The world premiere of the revue was in the Pfalztheater in Kaiserslautern, Germany, on 5 May 1990. It was performed by pianist Andrew Olivant, soprano Jayne Casselman, and Friedrich Schilha.

Theme
The Yellow Cake Revue concerns the threat that a uranium mine might be constructed near Stromness, a town on the largest island in Orkney, Scotland. Yellowcake, the revue's namesake, is the form of uranium that was discovered on the island. When a geological survey revealed the yellowcake deposits in the early 1970s, the South of Scotland Electricity Board wanted to mine the uranium to fuel a nuclear power plant. Once the islanders understood the ramifications of solution mining the island, they (and the Orkney Islands Council) opposed the initiative unilaterally. Davies was moved to write The Yellow Cake Revue after a public examiner's report advised the Secretary of State for Scotland to deny the SSEB's request to mine. Although he was English, Davies was an Orkney resident from 1971 until his death in 2016.

Structure
The work is a sequence of cabaret songs and recitations, with two interludes for piano. The first interlude, "Farewell to Stromness", has become one of Davies' most popular pieces, and has been arranged for various instruments. "Yesnaby Ground", too, is often performed as an independent piece.

 Tourist Board Song: O come to sunny Warbeth
 Patriotic Song: You've heard of the man with the pace-maker
 Piano Interlude: Farewell to Stromness 
 Recitation - Nuclear Job Interview 1: The Security Guard
 Uranium's Daughters' Dance: They said, when they'd extracted the uranium from the ore 
 Recitation - Nuclear Job Interview 2: The Truck Driver
 Atlantic Breezes
 Recitation - Nuclear Job Interview 3: The Mental Healthworker
 Piano Interlude: Yesnaby Ground 
 The Tourist Song: Have you heard of the terrorist suicide squad?
 The Triumph of the Cockroach: As earthquakes subsided

Farewell to Stromness
"Farewell to Stromness" is the single most famous piece of music from the composition, and is Davies's best-known and most often performed work. Originally written as a piano solo, it has been transcribed for several solo instruments, most notably guitar. Words were added to the tune by Ray Connolly for the 1983 Channel Four film, Forever Young. The lone representative of Davies's output in Classic FM Hall of Fame, "Farewell to Stromness" was the subject of the BBC Radio 4 programme Soul Music on 31 July 2019.

References

Compositions by Peter Maxwell Davies
1980 compositions
Compositions for piano
Compositions with a narrator